Lisson may refer to:

People
 Emilio Lissón, Archbishop of Lima, Peru
 Mario Lisson, baseball player

Other
 Lisson Gallery, art gallery
 Lisson Grove, district of City of Westminster, London